Eric Darius (born December 3, 1982), is an American saxophonist, vocalist, songwriter, producer, and educator.

Early life 
Darius was born in New Jersey to a father of Haitian descent and a mother of Jamaican descent. He grew up in Tampa, Florida. Born into a musical family, his father plays bass, his mother and sister sing, and his older brother plays drums and trumpet. Darius grew up listening to Stevie Wonder, Michael Jackson, Earth, Wind and Fire, Marvin Gaye, Al Green, Grover Washington, Jr., David Sanborn, George Benson, Bob Marley. He developed a love and appreciation for music at an early age, as his parents exposed him to music from many genres. The first time he saw someone playing saxophone was when in church when he was nine years old. He fell in love with the sound. His parents bought him a saxophone for his birthday.

He began his performing career at the age of 11, when he joined and toured with Sonny LaRosa and America's Youngest Jazz Band. The band included kids from the ages of five to twelve and toured worldwide, playing music by Duke Ellington, Count Basie, and Louis Armstrong. While performing with the band at the Montreux Jazz Festival, he decided to pursue a career in music.

At thirteen he left the youth band and his father became his manager. He started performing in Tampa Bay with his own band. As a teenager he performed over 100 shows per year. He attended Howard W. Blake High School of the Performing Arts. In high school he participated in music and sports. He performed with the Blake High School jazz band at the Essentially Ellington contest and festival at Lincoln Center. At seventeen he released his first album independently.

Darius attended the University of South Florida in Tampa, where he studied business and music. He studied jazz under the direction of Chuck Owens and Jack Wilkins and was a member of the university's Jazztet, which performed at the Montreaux Jazz Festival, North Sea Jazz Festival, Jazz à Vienne, and the Umbria Jazz Festival. During college, he signed a recording contract with Higher Octave Music.

Career 
His debut album Night on the Town was released in 2004 by Higher Octave and peaked at No. 32 on the jazz albums chart at Billboard magazine. This was followed by Just Getting Started, peaking at No. 18 (2006), Goin' All Out at 14 (2008), On a Mission at 10 (Shanachie, 2010), Retro Forward at 15 (2014), and Breakin' Thru at 19 (2018). The single "Goin' All Out" reached No. 1 on the Contemporary Jazz chart during the week of October 25, 2008.

His performance at the Catalina Island JazzTrax Festival earned him the JazzTrax Best Live Performance of the Year and the Smooth Jazz News Debut Artist of the Year.

Discography

References

External links
 

1982 births
Living people
American jazz alto saxophonists
American jazz tenor saxophonists
American male saxophonists
American jazz soprano saxophonists
American jazz singers
American jazz composers
Songwriters from California
American educators
Crossover jazz saxophonists
Smooth jazz saxophonists
Blue Note Records artists
University of South Florida alumni
Musicians from Los Angeles
21st-century American saxophonists
Jazz musicians from California
American male jazz composers
African-American male songwriters
21st-century African-American male singers
20th-century African-American male singers